Zedriv, officially Guoji Zhijun Automotive Co.,LTD, is a Chinese automobile manufacturer that specializes in developing electric vehicles. They were founded by Beijing based company Sinomach.

History 
Zedriv was founded on April 6, 2017, and is located in Ganzhou, Jiangxi Province, China. Their production plant is located in the New Energy Vehicle City Economic and Technological Development Zone. The plant is 1371 acres, with a total investment of 8 billion yuan, and a 100,000 unit capacity. Their slogan is "For a smart and joyful ride".

All four of their vehicles were shown at the 2019 Auto Shanghai, and all but the GT3 made production in 2020. 

The design of Zedriv vehicles were done by Guoji Zhijun Auto Europe R&D Center GMBH under the lead of their design chief, Lorenz Bittner, in Germany and Shanghai.

Vehicles 
 Zedriv GC1
 Zedriv GC2
 Zedriv GT3
 Zedriv GX5

See also 
 Yulu
 Youxia Motors
 Ciwei

References 

Electric vehicle manufacturers of China
Car brands
Car manufacturers of China
Chinese brands